Nagasato (written: 永里) is a Japanese surname. Notable people with the surname include:

, Japanese women's footballer
, Japanese footballer
, Japanese women's footballer

See also
Nagasato Station, a railway station in Isahaya, Nagasaki Prefecture, Japan

Japanese-language surnames